Untitled Web Series About a Space Traveler Who Can Also Travel Through Time (UWSAASTWCATTT), also known as Inspector Spacetime, is an adventure-sci-fi web series created by Travis Richey, and based on the television comedy series Community. The series is based on a fictional series first mentioned during the episode "Biology 101" of Community. Inspector Spacetime is, by itself, a Doctor Who parody. UWSAASTWCATTT follows The Inspector, a character that can travel through time and space by way of a red BOOTH (Bio Organic Omnidirectional Time Helix), a special space/timeship similar in some ways to the TARDIS.  Reception for the series has been positive, with USA Today including it in their "Best of TV on the Web in 2012" list. A feature film based on the series, entitled The Inspector Chronicles, is currently in production.

Production
The series was initially pitched to NBC (Communitys television network at the time), who appeared uninterested. Richey then began a Kickstarter campaign to fund the series, which was successful. After an animated teaser episode for the series was produced, NBC requested the production be cancelled. Richey continued with the series, but with references to the name 'Inspector Spacetime' removed and the appearance of the character altered. The series' name was then changed to Untitled Web Series About a Space Traveler Who Can Also Travel Through Time.

Season two began shooting in April 2013, with the announcement that Mayim Bialik would be joining the series as the voice of the time machine. In July 2013, it was also announced that Star Trek: Voyager alum Robert Picardo would also be joining the cast for season two. It has recently been announced that season 2, will instead be a feature film called The Inspector Chronicles: A Motion Picture about a Space Traveler who can also travel through time. Sylvester McCoy has joined the cast as Uncle Roderick. A crowdfunding campaign at indiegogo.com was released to fund development of the film, it made $36,993, passing its goal, which was $25,000.

Cast
Main cast as listed on the official website:
Travis Richey as The Inspector
Carrie Keranen as Piper Tate
Eric Loya as Boyish the Extraordinary

Guest stars include:
Sylvester McCoy as Uncle Roderick
Robert Picardo as Bernard
Chase Masterson as Annabelle Wagner
Mayim Bialik as B.O.O.T.H.
Nicholas Brendon as Chief Engineer Britman
Rosearik Rikki Simons as T.A.R.V.I.S.

References

External links
 
 
 Sivart Productions Tumblr

2012 web series debuts
Kickstarter-funded web series
Parodies
American science fiction web series
Fiction about time travel
Works based on Doctor Who
Community (TV series)